R9k can refer to:

 Robot9000, open source software
 /r9k/, a board on 4chan